The New Zealand women's national cricket team toured the Netherlands and Ireland in June and July 2002. They played both sides in a three match One Day International series, beating the Netherlands 3–0 and Ireland 2–0. Following the tour, they played England and India in a tri-series in England.

Tour of Netherlands

Squads

WODI Series

1st ODI

2nd ODI

3rd ODI

Tour of Ireland

Squads

WODI Series

1st ODI

2nd ODI

3rd ODI

References

External links
New Zealand Women tour of Netherlands 2002 from Cricinfo
New Zealand Women tour of Ireland 2002 from Cricinfo

New Zealand women's national cricket team tours
International cricket tours of the Netherlands
Women's international cricket tours of Ireland
International cricket competitions in 2002
2002 in women's cricket